Strategic family therapy is a short-term form of family therapy typically utilized with youths who struggle with behavioral issues such as drug addiction and delinquency.

See also
 Family therapy

References

Family therapy